In Norse mythology, a  (Old Norse: , pl.   or   — "warden," "watcher" or "caretaker") is a warden spirit, believed to follow from birth to death the soul of every person.

History
The belief in this type of guardian spirits remained strong in Scandinavian folklore up until the last centuries and continues to be found in northern faith based religions today.

At times, the warden could reveal itself as a small light or as the shape of the person. The perception of another person's warden could cause a physical sensation such as an itching hand or nose, as a foreboding or an apparition. The warden could arrive before the actual person, which someone endowed with fine senses might perceive. The warden of a dead person could also become a revenant, haunting particular spots or individuals.

Under the influence of Christianity, the belief in wardens changed. Some view the spirit as being more akin to the Christian concept of a good and a bad conscience, while others view them as guardian angels.

Warden trees

A very old tree (often a linden, ash or elm) growing on the farm lot could be dubbed a "warden tree", or tuntre and was believed to defend it from bad luck. Breaking a leaf or twig from the warden tree was considered a serious offence. The respect for the tree was so great that the family housing it could adopt a surname related to it, such as Linnæus, Lindelius and Almén. It was often believed that the wights (Swedish ) of the yard lived under the roots of the warden tree, and to them, one sacrificed treats to be freed from disease or bad luck.
The Guardian trees were said to have been taken from sacred groves as saplings by pre Christian Germanic peoples, though today can be planted from anywhere.

See also
 
 
 Huginn and Muninn
  (Finnish paganism)
 
 Guardian spirit (disambiguation)

References

External links
 Vård  	 	Nordisk familjebok 

Scandinavian folklore
Norwegian folklore
Swedish folklore
Scandinavian legendary creatures
Creatures in Norse mythology